16 teams participated in the 1995–96 Egyptian Premier League season. The first team in the league was the champion, and was supposed to qualify to the CAF Champions League, but this did not happen as Al Ahly was boycotting the CAF competitions so the runner up Zamalek qualified instead.
Al Ahly managed to win the league for the 25th time in the club's history.

League table

Top goalscorers

References

1995–96 in African association football leagues
0
Premier